Area D may refer to:

 Area D (video game), a 1997 adventure video game
 Area D: Inō Ryōiki, a 2012 manga series